B.Thurka Palle is a village in the Nalgonda district of the Indian state of Telangana. It is located in Ramannapet mandal of Bhongir revenue division.

References

Villages in Nalgonda district